Adventurers' Land is a  geological Site of Special Scientific Interest (SSSI) north of March in Cambridgeshire. It is a Geological Conservation Review site.

The site is described by Natural England as important for the study of changes in Holocene sea levels. There are five peat levels dating to between 6,400 and 1,850 years BP, and the earliest represents the oldest directly dated transgression of the sea into the Fens. Part of the site is also in the Nene Washes biological SSSI.

A public footpath along the north bank of the River Nene from Guyhirn goes through the site, which has been filled in and no geology is visible.

References

Sites of Special Scientific Interest in Cambridgeshire
Geological Conservation Review sites